Ryukyuan missions to Imperial China were diplomatic missions that were intermittently sent from the Ryukyuan kings to  the Ming and Qing emperors. These diplomatic contacts were within the Sinocentric system of bilateral and multinational relationships in East Asia. A total of 347 Ryukyuan missions to China have been recorded.

History
King Satto of Chūzan established formal relations with China in 1374. Satto became the first Ryukyuan king to send a mission to China. He was also the first to receive investiture and to submit to Chinese suzerainty in 1372.

The Ming and Qing archival records identify the Ryukyu Islands among the "unconquered barbarian countries" rather than among China's colonies.  The Ryukyuan missions to China were managed by the Reception Department of the Board of Ceremonies rather than by some other Imperial bureau or agency.

The 500-years old tributary missions ended in the late 19th century when the Sinocentric tributary state system was superseded by the Westphalian multi-state system, i.e. in 1875 during the forced annexation period of the Ryukyu Kingdom (then Ryukyu Domain) by the Empire of Japan.

See also
 Imperial Chinese missions to the Ryukyu Kingdom
 Foreign relations of Imperial China
 Ryukyuan missions to Joseon
 Joseon missions to the Ryukyu Kingdom
 Ryukyuan missions to Edo
 Ryūkyū-kan
 Kōchi Chōjō

Notes

References
 Kang, David C. (2010). East Asia Before the West: Five Centuries of Trade and Tribute. New York : Columbia University Press. ; 
 
 Kerr, George H. (1965). Okinawa, the History of an Island People. Rutland, Vermont: C.E. Tuttle Co.

Further reading
 Goodrich, Luther Carrington and Zhaoying Fang. (1976).  Dictionary of Ming biography, 1368-1644 (明代名人傳), Vol. I;  Dictionary of Ming biography, 1368-1644 (明代名人傳), Vol. II.  New York: Columbia University Press. ; 
 Mizuno, Norihito. (2003). China in Tokugawa Foreign Relations: The Tokugawa Bakufu’s Perception of and Attitudes toward Ming-Qing China, p. 109. excerpt from Japan and Its East Asian Neighbors: Japan's Perceptionf of China and Korea and the Making of Foreign Policy from the Seventeenth to the Nineteenth Century, Ph.D. dissertation, Ohio State University, 2004, as cited in Tsutsui, William M. (2009).  A Companion to Japanese History, p. 83.
 Nussbaum, Louis-Frédéric. (2002). Japan Encyclopedia. Cambridge: Harvard University Press. ; 
 Suganuma, Unryu. (2000). Sovereign Rights and Territorial Space in Sino-Japanese Relations: Irredentism and the Diaoyu/Senkaku Islands. Honolulu: University of Hawaii Press. ; 
 Toby, Ronald P. (1991). [https://books.google.com/books?id=2hK7tczn2QoC State and Diplomacy in Early Modern Japan: Asia in the Development of the Tokugawa Bakufu. Stanford: Stanford University Press. 
 Yoda, Yoshiie. (1996). The Foundations of Japan's Modernization: a comparison with China's Path towards Modernization. Leiden: Brill. ; 

Foreign relations of the Ryukyu Kingdom
Foreign relations of the Ming dynasty
Foreign relations of the Qing dynasty